Chongqing Central Park is one of the largest open public urban parks in China. The rectangular-shaped park covers a territory of about 1.53 square kilometers. The purpose of building the park was to provide Chongqing residents with a big open park, like Central Park in New York City and Hyde Park in London, to play outdoor recreational sports and to enjoy nature.

The park is located in Yubei District, Chongqing, China. The northern half of the park is designed to be a huge open square. The Central Square in this park, with an area of 30 hectares, is able to hold at least 100,000 people at once. The Jieqing Avenue, 20 meters wide and 600 meters long, cuts through the northern half of the park. The southern half of the park is designed to be a natural area, with grassland, forests, hills, and freshwater ponds.

Transport

Metro stations
Central Park West station
Central Park station
Central Park East station

Yubei District
Parks in Chongqing